The Tinkertown Museum is a folk art museum in Sandia Park, New Mexico. The museum was founded by artist Ross Ward

References

External links
 Home

Museums in New Mexico